Emmanuelle de Boysson is a French writer and literary critic. She is also one of the founders of the Closerie des Lias prize. She has published numerous essays and novels inspired by the women of Paris, including the bestselling Les Grandes bourgeoises (2006).

References

French women writers
French writers
1955 births
Living people